Podvrško  is a village in the municipality of Cernik in the west part of Brod-Posavina County.

References

Populated places in Brod-Posavina County